La Entrada is a town in the Honduran department of Copán.

The mayor of La Entrada is Mr. Vicente León Rojas.

Its name is [Spanish] for "the entrance" and the town is a gateway from coastal Honduras to the mountainous Western highlands.

Close to La Entrada are the Mayan archaeological ruins at El Puente.

Sports
The local football club, Olimpia Occidental, play in the Honduran second division. They play their home games at the Estadio Alsacias.

Municipalities of the Copán Department